The Basra War Cemetery was a military cemetery in Basra, Iraq, built for soldiers killed during the Mesopotamian campaign in the First World War. It was maintained by the Commonwealth War Graves Commission until 2007. Those buried at the cemetery include Victoria Cross recipient George Godfrey Massy Wheeler, and Henry Howard, 19th Earl of Suffolk.

The Daily Telegraph reported on 10 November 2013 that the cemetery has been completely destroyed, with all 4,000 headstones knocked down and broken by looters and vandals.

See also
 Amara War Cemetery
 Basra Memorial

References

External links
 
 

Buildings and structures in Basra
Commonwealth War Graves Commission cemeteries in Iraq